The following elections occurred in the year 1884.

Europe
 1884 Croatian parliamentary election
 1884 Danish Folketing election
 1884 German federal election
 1884 Paisley by-election
 1884 Portuguese legislative election
 1884 Spanish general election

North America

United States
 1884 New York state election
 1884 South Carolina gubernatorial election
 1884 United States House of Representatives elections
 United States House of Representatives elections in California, 1884
 United States House of Representatives elections in South Carolina, 1884
 1884 United States presidential election
 1884 and 1885 United States Senate elections

Oceania
 1884 New Zealand general election

See also
 :Category:1884 elections

1884
Elections